The Cosby Mysteries was an American mystery drama television series starring Bill Cosby that aired on NBC from September 21, 1994, to April 12, 1995. 19 episodes were made. It was the first television series to star Cosby since The Cosby Show (which ended in the spring of 1992) and lasted one season (1994–1995). Actor/rapper  Mos Def appeared in several episodes (credited as Dante Smith).

Plot 

Cosby played Guy Hanks, a New York City Police Department criminalist, who retired from the force after winning $44 million in the lottery.

His peaceful retirement was frequently interrupted by his former colleagues, Detective Adam Sully (James Naughton) and Medical Examiner John Chapman (Robert Stanton), who asked him to consult on tough cases. As Hanks used his wits and his forensics knowledge to solve crimes, he dealt with his holistic housekeeper Angie (Rita Moreno) and his girlfriend Barbara Lorenz (Lynn Whitfield).

Production history 

The show was created by David Black and William Link. Link's previous series included Columbo on NBC and Murder, She Wrote on CBS. Link developed the series at Cosby's request, as Cosby wanted to make an intelligent, character-driven mystery series that did not rely on graphic violence.

The show began on January 31, 1994, as a two hour movie, and 18 regular episodes began airing on NBC on September 21, 1994. Its NBC premiere ranked 54th among the season's network prime time series. Executive producer William Link criticized NBC for not effectively advertising the show before its premiere launch. NBC Entertainment president Warren Littlefield blamed Bill Cosby for not using his personal fame to promote the show. 

At the beginning of 1995, William Link and David Black were dropped from the production team by NBC.

On April 12, 1995, The Cosby Mysteries ceased operations for good.

Critics expressed hope that The Cosby Mysteries would fare better than Cosby's previous two ventures, Here and Now and the game show remake, You Bet Your Life. The Cosby Mysteries only lasted 18 episodes, and was cancelled in February 1995. The Cosby Mysteries has been rerun in the United Kingdom, on digital channel ITV1, and in the US on A&E, STARZ! Mystery and TV One. 

The Cosby Mysteries was shot in New York City by SAH Enterprises.

Cast
Bill Cosby as Guy Hanks
Rita Moreno as Angie
Robert Stanton as Medical Examiner John Chapman 
James Naughton as Det. Adam Scully
Mos Def as Dante Beze 
Lynn Whitfield as  Barbara Lorenz

Series overview

Episodes

Pilot (1994)

Season 1 (1994-95)

In popular culture
In an episode of The Simpsons, "Guess Who's Coming to Criticize Dinner?", Homer Simpson laments the cancellation of The Cosby Mysteries, saying "That show had limitless possibilities!"
 An episode of Saturday Night Live hosted by Patrick Stewart on February 5, 1994, did a parody sketch of The Cosby Mysteries. Adam Sandler played Cosby as a buffoonish character, who rambles on incoherently with dialog full of made up nonsense words.

References

External links

Bill Cosby
1990s American drama television series
1994 American television series debuts
1995 American television series endings
1990s American mystery television series
English-language television shows
Fictional portrayals of the New York City Police Department
Forensic science in popular culture
NBC original programming
Television series by Sony Pictures Television
Television shows set in New York City
American detective television series
Television series created by William Link